"Need to Know" is a song by the British record producer Wilkinson, featuring vocals from London-based singer Iman Osman, simply known as Iman. It was released on 2 December 2012, through RAM Records, as the first single from his debut album Lazers Not Included. The single includes the double A-side song "Direction", which is not included on the album. The song has peaked at number 195 on the UK Singles Chart and number 27 on the UK Dance Chart, the song has also charted in Belgium. The lyrics are based on the song "Watcha Doing Now?" (Full Intention mix) by Anthony Moriah.

Track listing

Chart performance

Weekly charts

Release history

References

Wilkinson (musician) songs
2012 songs
2012 singles
RAM Records singles